The 2008 Glenrothes by-election was a by-election held in Scotland on 6 November 2008 to elect a new  Member of Parliament (MP) for the House of Commons constituency of Glenrothes in Fife, Scotland.

The seat fell vacant when the previous MP, John MacDougall (Labour), died of pleural mesothelioma on 13 August 2008, aged 60. Pleural Mesothelioma is a rare form of lung cancer caused by prolonged exposure to asbestos.

The by-election was won by Lindsay Roy of the Labour Party.

Result

Background
Fife is traditionally a stronghold for the Labour Party.  MacDougall had held Glenrothes and its forerunner, Central Fife, since 2001, when he succeeded Henry McLeish.  Willie Hamilton had previously represented the area, which has elected Labour MPs since Hamilton won West Fife from the Communist Party of Great Britain in 1950.

The poll followed a run of poor by-election results for the Labour Party, which included a loss to the Scottish National Party (SNP) in Glasgow East, formerly the party's twenty-fifth safest seat in Britain.  Glenrothes has a considerably smaller Labour majority than Glasgow East had.

According to the Financial Times, Labour privately admitted that they expected to lose Glenrothes to the SNP.  The Guardian described the constituency's main town, Glenrothes, as a "core area" for the SNP.  The SNP were in second place in the seat in the 2005 general election and won the nearest equivalent seat in the 2007 Scottish Parliament election.

The SNP also ran Fife Council, which covers the constituency, in coalition with the Scottish Liberal Democrats.  The Scottish Liberal Democrats won the last by-election to be held in Fife from Labour on a swing of 16%.

Polling date
By tradition, the polling date was decided by Labour, as MacDougall's party, and set for Thursday,   6 November 2008.

Had the writ been moved immediately the by-election could have been held as early as mid-September, although this coincided with the Trades Union Congress annual conference and the following weeks were filled with various party conferences. A Labour loss during this period could have provided a particular boost for their opponents, or for dissident elements within the party. The SNP may have favoured a quick by-election, noting that Labour called the Glasgow East by-election rapidly, when commentators believed it was to Labour's advantage.

Candidates
The Labour party candidate was Kirkcaldy High School rector Lindsay Roy.  The SNP selected the leader of Fife Council, Peter Grant. The Conservative Party selected Maurice Golden while the Liberal Democrats chose Harry Wills.  The Scottish Socialist Party stood Morag Balfour, their national co-chair, who lived in Glenrothes and had been a candidate in the constituency before.  Solidarity stood Louise McLeary, a community activist who lived in the part of Kirkcaldy which lies inside the constituency. The UKIP candidate was Dr. Kris Seunarine a specialist in the science of biophotonics at Dundee university, and chairman of the Fife branch of UKIP.

Two of the minor party candidates had disabilities: Balfour was a wheelchair user and McLeary was visually impaired.

2005 Election Result

Marked register
Some months after the election, the marked register (on which the electors who had cast their vote were marked) was discovered to be missing. In law the register ought to have been preserved for a year and a day; the Returning Officer from Fife Council had transmitted the marked register to the Sheriff Court as required by law and obtained a receipt. The SNP Constituency Organiser, Cllr John Beare, had asked for a copy of the marked register on 19 November 2008; after ten weeks, the Scottish Court Service admitted the marked register was lost. An inquiry by the Scottish Court Service identified significant failings in its handling of election documents, which had been placed in a room at the court office in Kirkcaldy to which outside contractors had access.

In October 2009, the Scotland Office agreed a protocol to create a substitute marked register for the election.

References

External links
Scottish Election Results 1997 - present
 http://www.fifetoday.co.uk/news/local-headlines/mystery_of_the_glenrothes_by_election_missing_papers_1_153322
 https://web.archive.org/web/20120504153408/http://scotcourts.gov.uk/docs/report/Report_Investigation_into_Missing_Electoral_Register2009.pdf

2008 elections in the United Kingdom
2008 in Scotland
2008 Glenrothes
By-elections to the Parliament of the United Kingdom in Scottish constituencies
Politics of Fife
21st century in Fife
November 2008 events in the United Kingdom